Xiangqi made its debut appearance at the 2021 Southeast Asian Games which took place at Legacy Yên Tử in Quảng Ninh, Vietnam from 14 to 20 May 2022.

Participating nations

 (host)

Medal table

Medalists

Reference

External links
  

2021 Southeast Asian Games events
Xiangqi competitions